The Daehan Gyenyeonsa (A History of the Final Years of the Empire of Great Han of Korea) is, as the title indicates, a history of the final forty years of Korea's Joseon dynasty (after 1898 known as the Empire of Great Han). It was penned by a minor government official and member of the Korean enlightenment movement, Jeong Gyo (鄭喬 1856-1925), about whom little is known. The books is chronologically ordered and much of the historical content is based upon Jeong's own experiences and eye-witness accounts, yielding up rich historical detail and anecdote not available elsewhere. It is particularly useful in its details of Korea's Independence Club.

References

Joseon dynasty
History books about Korea